Holbrook High School is a high school in Holbrook, Arizona, United States. It is the only high school under the jurisdiction of the Holbrook Unified School District. Adjacent to the school is a Bureau of Indian Affairs-operated dormitory, the Tiisyatin Residential Hall, housing a maximum of 128 students.

Holbrook USD (which is the high school's attendance boundary) serves the majority of the city of Holbrook and several census-designated places in Navajo County, Arizona: Greasewood, Indian Wells, Sun Valley, Woodruff, and much of Dilkon and Whitecone.

Notable alumni
 Mike Budenholzer, former professional basketball player overseas; former assistant coach of the NBA's San Antonio Spurs; former head coach of the NBA's Atlanta Hawks; current  head coach of the NBA's  Milwaukee Bucks.

References

Public high schools in Arizona
Holbrook, Arizona
Schools in Navajo County, Arizona